Hammerspace (also known as malletspace) is a fan-envisioned extradimensional, instantly accessible storage area in fiction, which is used to explain how animated, comic, and game characters can produce objects out of thin air. Typically, when multiple items are available, the desired item is available on the first try or within a handful of tries.

This phenomenon dates back to early Warner Bros.' Looney Tunes/Merrie Melodies  and MGM cartoons produced during the Golden Age of American animation. For example, in the 1943 Tex Avery short What's Buzzin' Buzzard, a starving vulture prepares to cook his friend by pulling an entire kitchen's worth of appliances out of thin air.

Origins
The phenomenon of a character producing plot-dependent items seemingly out of thin air dates back to the beginning of animated shorts during The Golden Age of American animation. Warner Bros. Cartoon characters are particularly well known for often pulling all sorts of things—hammers, guns, disguises, matches, bombs, anvils, mallets—from behind their backs or just off-screen. However, this phenomenon was mostly just left to suspension of disbelief. Only decades later was the term hammerspace jokingly coined to describe the phenomenon.

The term itself originates from a gag common in some anime and manga. A typical example would be when a male character would anger or otherwise offend a female character, who would proceed to produce, out of thin air, an over-sized wooden rice mallet (okine) and hit him on the head with it in an exaggerated manner. The strike would be purely for comic effect, and it would not have any long-lasting effects. The term was largely popularized first by fans of Urusei Yatsura and later by fans of Ranma ½. It is believed by some that the term "hammerspace" itself was coined based on the Ranma ½ character Akane Tendo due to the fan perception that she has a tendency to produce large hammers from nowhere. In the original manga she much more frequently uses her fists and/or objects that were pictured in the nearby scenery. The anime makes more use of hammers as a comedic tool than the manga.

Another series that may have contributed to the term is City Hunter. One of the lead characters in City Hunter—Kaori—makes extensive use of the "transdimensional hammers" as they are sometimes called, as they are one of the two main running gags in the series; the other is the extreme lecherousness of the other main character—Ryo—which almost invariably leads to the use of said hammers. The City Hunter hammers also require more explaining in terms of storage, as they are often considerably larger than the characters themselves, and thus more likely to inspire questions like, "Where did she get that from!?" At the very least, City Hunter predates Ranma ½ by two years, and already had an extensive fanbase.

Another series that made extensive use of hammerspace was Kodomo no Omocha, where the mother of the main character would pull toy hammers of varying sizes to tap her daughter on the head to forge breaks in her ranting and offer a chance to glean understanding and wisdom. Trope-laden webcomic Okashina Okashi – Strange Candy also features hammerspace, this time named directly as such, accessible by the weapons nut Petra.

In media

Video games

The oldest use of hammerspace in games is probably the bag of holding of the Dungeons & Dragons role-playing game, a magical item able to hold far more than normally possible, its contents actually being held in a pocket dimension or part of the Astral Plane. An early computer example of the concept is the 1984 Infocom text adventure The Hitchhiker's Guide to the Galaxy, which contained a "Thing your Aunt gave you which you don't know what it is" as a humorous variant of the bag of holding concept (and which proved critical to finishing the game itself).

The theory of hammerspace can also be applied to many other video games, as game mechanics often defy those of the real world: for instance, a character might be able to carry a sword larger than themselves without any sign of it before use, and most video game characters can carry an implausible number of tools or other objects. This is particularly visible in traditional adventure games and RPGs, such as The Legend of Zelda. In New Super Mario Bros. Wii, the player has endless space to put their items. In many Super Mario games, the Hammer Bros. are capable of throwing an infinite supply of hammers from hammerspace. Early first-person shooter games tend to have the player character carry an entire arsenal of weapons (with full ammunition) without any visible drawback such as loss of pace or fatigue. In the Grand Theft Auto game series, players are capable of holding an arsenal of weaponry and multiple items and equipment in hammerspace. This capability has more a significant appearance in Grand Theft Auto V, where the characters are able to carry multiple pistols, SMGs, LMGs, assault rifles, carbines, shotguns, sniper and marksman rifles, melee weaponry, throwables, rocket and grenade launchers, and a minigun all at once on themselves. In Fallout, the NPCs and player use hammerspaces where they take weapons out of nowhere.

Many comical adventures make gags on space in item inventories. In Space Quest series III and VI, protagonist Roger Wilco crams a full-sized ladder into his pocket. In Simon the Sorcerer, Simon similarly obtains a ladder at one point, which he stores in his hat. In The Secret of Monkey Island, as a recurring gag, Guybrush Threepwood usually barely fits an oversized item in his clothes, from a six-foot-long cotton swab to a huge figurehead, or even a monkey (which is shown moving underneath his coat). At one point early in The Curse of Monkey Island, he makes a "yikes" face after sheathing a bread knife down his pants. A similar concept is evident in Sonic the Hedgehog, most notably with Amy Rose, who actually materializes hammers from hammerspace.

In some non-humorous cases, hammerspace may be recognized as a seemingly normal in-universe phenomenon. Characters from the Kingdom Hearts series are capable of materializing weapons from thin air and making them disappear again, notably in the case of main character Sora and his Keyblade; though it's implied that they are stored as magic in the wielders' hearts. Similarly, playable characters in Genshin Impact are shown to materialize and dissipate their equipped weapons during attack animations; however, this has also been visibly demonstrated in some cutscenes, where characters who were once unarmed are able to suddenly draw out their weapons from thin air before attacking, just as they would in regular gameplay.

Although there are numerous examples from the genre, hammerspace usage is not just limited to adventure games. In The Sims 2,The Sims 3 and The Sims 4, the Sims make extensive use of hammerspace, regularly pulling items out of their back pockets which could not possibly fit there. Examples include rakes, hairdryers, watering cans and bags of flour.

Similarly, in the sandbox game Minecraft, a player character can carry thousands of tonnes of material such as gold in the character's inventory without encumbrance, as if an empty inventory were the same as a full one. In reality, even one block of most materials in Minecraft would weigh hundreds or thousands of kilograms, and the player can carry up to 2304 blocks in their inventory. Since some blocks can be converted into multiple blocks of another type, it is possible to carry enough material to build an entire city in one's inventory invisibly.

Hammerspace is also used frequently in fighting games. In the Super Smash Bros. games, Princess Peach is said to pull a Toad out of hammerspace for a blocking move. In the Punch-Out!! series many characters can pull out objects from hammerspace.

Television
Bill Smith, a character on The Red Green Show (played by series co-creator Rick Green), regularly employs hammerspace in the "Adventures With Bill" segments. Bill is often seen pulling large objects—hammers, saws, bicycles, weightlifting equipment, camping equipment, sports gear, and the like—out of his trousers.

Film
The character of Harpo Marx is often seen retrieving large numbers of items from his seemingly bottomless coat pockets.
Curly Howard of the Three Stooges similarly would have tools or other objects in the lining of his jacket, as in, for example, In the Sweet Pie and Pie.
 The title character of the All That sketch Baggin' Saggin' Barry spends the entirety of his sketches pulling whatever item is required at the moment, regardless of its size, from his baggy pants.
The character of Jerry Steiner in the TV show Parker Lewis Can't Lose possessed the same capacity, often using it to feed Larry Kubiac with raw fish he pulls out of his infinite pockets.
In Pirates! Band of Misfits, the Pirate Captain is known to stash various items inside his beard, including an umbrella, an alarm clock and his pet dodo, Polly.
In The Mask film, Jim Carrey's character The Mask produces numerous items from pockets during a fight scene for comic effect.
Mary Poppins's carpetbag easily holds a floor lamp, a hat stand, and other such outlandish items, and their removal from the bag is used for comic effect, and to establish her as a somewhat magical entity.
In Scott Pilgrim vs. the World, Ramona Flowers pulls a hammer from hammerspace to fight.
Within the Potterverse, magical examples akin to hammerspace include the Niffler, a creature prominently featured in Fantastic Beasts and Where to Find Them (2016), which can store excessive amounts of loot in its pouch; and Hermione Granger's small handbag, which contains vast quantities of items that she can retrieve on demand.

Notes
 The term "hammerspace" is often used synonymously with "magic satchel"; however, hammerspace is an actual extra dimension where items are stored, whereas a magic satchel uses magic to either contain these items or to access hammerspace itself.
 More often than not, non-animated occurrences in film or television are explained as a plot hole rather than hammerspace access, and dismissed due to suspension of disbelief. Examples include the live-action Highlander TV series, where the sword-wielding Immortals often have their weapons readily available despite their lack of a suitable container or article of clothing in which to carry a concealed sword.

References

 Hidden Objects: The Hammerspace Phenomenon. Retrieved on October 23, 2006.

Anime and manga terminology
Cartoon physics
Fictional dimensions